In Greek mythology, the name Pegaea may refer to:

Pegaea (mythology), one of the Ionides
Pegaea, singular form of Pegaeae